Oracle Cloud Enterprise Resource Planning  is a cloud-based ERP software application suite introduced by Oracle Corporation in 2012. Oracle ERP Cloud manages enterprise functions including accounting, financial management, project management, and procurement.

Product
Oracle Cloud ERP is an end-to-end Software as a service suite that manages enterprise operations. The suite runs on an Oracle technology stack in Oracle’s cloud centers. Oracle Cloud ERP is accessible through both public and private cloud implementation and supports hybrid deployment. Oracle supplies updates to Oracle ERP Cloud at least twice annually. According to the company’s website, there are nine different software modules that make up the Oracle Cloud ERP  suite, namely:
 	Financials
	Accounting Hub
	Procurement
	Project Management
	Risk Management
	Enterprise Performance Management (EPM)
	AI Apps for ERP
	Supply Chain Management (SCM)
	NetSuite
 
In March 2017, Oracle ERP Cloud received HIPAA certification. The software suite is designed to support international enterprise functions and includes multi-GAAP, multi-currency, multi-language, and multi-subsidiary capabilities.

History
Oracle Cloud ERP was based originally on Oracle Fusion Applications, Oracle’s enterprise resource planning software suite developed for Oracle Fusion Architecture and Oracle Fusion Middleware released in 2011. In June 2012, Oracle CTO and chairman of the board Larry Ellison announced the Oracle Cloud ERP application suite as a part of Oracle Cloud, the company’s broad set of cloud-based applications. Oracle announced preview availability of Oracle Cloud ERP at Oracle OpenWorld 2012. In October 2015, the company reported that Oracle ERP Cloud had surpassed 1,300 customers. On August 2, 2017, Oracle announced Release 13 of Oracle Cloud ERP .
 
In 2017, Oracle CEO Safra Catz announced the availability of Oracle Cloud ERP  in India to assist the country in preparation of its Goods and Services tax reforms.

In March 2017, Oracle reported that Oracle Cloud ERP  had grown 280% in fiscal quarter 3.

In September 2017, it was reported Oracle’s cloud ERP business grew 156% in first quarter 2017-18 and had reached an annual run rate of $1.2 billion.

Regions 
Oracle ERP Cloud is available in North America, South America, Asia and EMEA regions.

Certifications 
Oracle offers certifications in Software as a Service (SaaS) specializations for Oracle ERP Cloud.

Oracle Financials Cloud

 Oracle Accounting Hub Cloud 2017 Certified Implementation Specialist
 Oracle Financials Cloud: General Ledger 2017 Certified Implementation Specialist
 Oracle Financials Cloud: Payables 2017 Certified Implementation Specialist
 Oracle Financials Cloud: Receivables 2017 Certified Implementation Specialist
 Oracle Revenue Management Cloud Service 2017 Certified Implementation Specialist

Oracle Procurement Cloud

 Oracle Procurement Cloud 2017 Certified Implementation Specialist

Oracle Project Portfolio Management Cloud

 Oracle Project Portfolio Management Cloud 2017 Certified Implementation Specialist

Oracle Risk Management Cloud

 Oracle Financial Reporting Compliance Cloud 2017 Certified Implementation Specialist

Notable customers & partnerships
 Bank of America

 Thomson Reuters

 Qantas
 Blue Shield of California
 Office for National Statistics

 Hearst
 Wake Forest Baptist Medical Center

 Health Care Service Corporation
 Carbon
 HM Treasury
 PrimeQ
 Caesar Entertainment

Academic institutions 
 The College of New Jersey
 Shawnee State University
 Birmingham City University
 University of Wyoming
 Boise State University
 University of Kansas
Vanderbilt University
San Bernardino Community College

Events

Oracle OpenWorld 
Oracle OpenWorld is an annual technology conference hosted by Oracle and has featured announcements of updates to Oracle ERP Cloud.

COLLABORATE 
COLLABORATE is an annual technology forum hosted by independent Oracle users groups, including the International Oracle Users Group (IOUG), the Oracle Applications Users Group (OAUG), and Quest Oracle Community, that provides training for Oracle products including Oracle ERP Cloud.

Awards and recognition 
In 2017, Oracle Cloud ERP  was listed as a leader in Gartner’s “Magic Quadrant for Cloud Core Financial Management Suites for Midsize, Large and Global Enterprises.” The product was positioned the highest for both completeness of vision and ability to execute.

See also
Enterprise software

References

External links
 

Accounting software
Project management software
ERP software
Oracle software
Computer-related introductions in 2012
Cloud applications
Cloud platforms
Enterprise software 
Business software
Human resource management software 
Customer relationship management software